The Crucifixion by Tintoretto is a large painting in oil on canvas, installed in the Sala dell'Albergo of the Scuola Grande di San Rocco, Venice. It is signed and dated 1565. This painting is one of the most dramatic versions of the Crucifixion in the history of Christian religious art.

References
 Nichols, Tom. 1999. Tintoretto: tradition and identity. London: Reaktion Books.
 Rosand, D. 1997. Painting in sixteenth-century Venice: Titian, Veronese, Tintoretto (Rev. ed.). Cambridge ; New York: Cambridge University Press.
 Partridge, Loren W. 2015. Art of Renaissance Venice, 1400-1600. Berkeley: University of California Press

Notes

1565 paintings
Oil paintings
Paintings by Tintoretto
Paintings depicting the Crucifixion of Jesus
Paintings in Venice